Stephen Watt may refer to:

 Stephen Watt (politician) (born 1956), American politician
 Stephen Huntley Watt (born 1984), computer consultant and ex-hacker
 Stephen M. Watt, computer scientist and mathematician
 Stephen Watt (curler), English curler

See also 
 Stephen Watts (born 1979), English cricketer